Xinning is a town in Fusui County in southern Guangxi, China. , it had an area of  populated by an estimated 85,512 people residing in 5 residential communities and 8 villages.

Administrative divisions
There are 5 residential communities and 8 villages:

Residential communities:
 Chengxiang (城厢社区), Chengdong (城东社区), Chengxi (城西社区), Chengnan (城南社区), Xiufeng (秀峰社区)

Villages:
 Chonghe (充禾村), Changsha (长沙村), Nakuan (那宽村), Shuibian (水边村), Tangan (塘岸村), Shangdong (上洞村), Datang (大塘村), Quna (渠那村)

See also
List of township-level divisions of Guangxi
Other Xinnings, particularly the more famous former Xinning in Guangdong, now Taishan

References

External links
 Xinning Town/Guangxi Ethnic Affairs Commission net

Towns of Guangxi
Fusui County